Francisco Jose Contreras is a Spanish jurist, professor and politician who has been a member of the Congress of Deputies for the Vox party since the April 2019 elections.

Biography
Contreras holds a degree in law from the University of Seville where he has also taught law and political theory since 2007. His academic work has focused on the writing of Immanuel Kant.

He is also the co-author of the book Historical Memory; a threat to peace in Europe which was published by the European Conservatives and Reformists group in the European Parliament. The book contains contributions from Hermann Tertsch and Stanley G. Payne among others.

Political career
Contreras is the leader of the executive committee for the Vox party in Seville. During the Spanish general election of 2019, he was elected to the Congress of Deputies.

References 

1964 births
Living people
Members of the 13th Congress of Deputies (Spain)
Members of the 14th Congress of Deputies (Spain)
Vox (political party) politicians
20th-century Spanish lawyers
People from Seville
21st-century Spanish lawyers